The Municipal Stadium of Águeda is a multiuse stadium located in the civil parish of Borrolha, in the municipality of Águeda, in the Portuguese district of Aveiro.

History
Open in 2003, the stadium has a capacity for 10,000 people. Primarily used as venue for football matches, it is the home stadium of Recreio Desportivo de Águeda. The Recreio had for several years used the Campo de Venda Nova, until April 1974, when the field Redolho was acquired. The purchase of the lands were initiated by professor Marques de Queirós, then president of the municipal authority. This was the beginning of a "golden" era for association football in Águeda, when the team was ranked as one of the best national clubs, responsible for exporting notable players to other countries and culminating it the clubs ascension to 1st Division in 1982–1983.

In 2004 it was the venue for a friendly match between the Portugal national team and the Luxembourg national squad, on 29 May.

Architecture
The municipal stadium is situated parallel the Souto River fronting various pasturelands and cultivated parcels, nearby the Palace of Borralha. The stadium includes grass pitch with central, covered bleacher, as well as bunks to the north and west. 

The former-trainer Mico Figueiredo once indicated that municipal pitch is the greatest adversary of whom presents a quality game, on the eve of the 1st Division district championship.

References

Municipal de Agueda
Buildings and structures in Águeda
Sports venues in Aveiro District
Sport in Águeda
Sports venues completed in 2003